Mahendra Kumari was a member of Lok Sabha. She was elected to Lok Sabha from Alwar in Rajasthan as a candidate of Bharatiya Janata Party. She was born in Bundi in 1942 to a royal family and educated at Scindia Girls College, Gwalior. She was wife of ruler of Alwar- Pratap Singh.

Mahendra Kumari was a Member of Tenth Lok Sabha from 1991 to 1996 representing Alwar Parliamentary Constituency of Rajasthan. Mahendra Kumari was a Member of Committee on Science and Technology, Environment and Forests from 1993 to 1996 and House Committee from 1993 to 1995.

A keen sports enthusiast, Mahendra Kumari was a champion women's pistol shooter and had special interest in tennis, swimming and riding. A widely travelled person, Mahendra Kumari was a Member of Indian Parliamentary Group of the Fourth World Conference on Women in Beijing, China in 1995.

She died on 27 June 2002 at New Delhi at the age of 60 after a brief illness.

References 

Rajasthani politicians
Women in Rajasthan politics
1942 births
2002 deaths
People from Alwar
India MPs 1991–1996
Bharatiya Janata Party politicians from Rajasthan
Lok Sabha members from Rajasthan
20th-century Indian women politicians
20th-century Indian politicians